Rajab is the seventh month of the Islamic calendar, Rajab may also refer to:

Places
 Naqsh-e Rajab, archaeological site in Iran
 Rajab, Jalandhar, village in India
 Rajab, village in Jordan

People
 Rajab (name), an Arabic given name